Marjan Janevski (born February 26, 1988) is a Macedonian professional basketball player for KK Kumanovo of the Macedonian First League. He is also a member of the Macedonian national basketball team.

References

1988 births
Living people
KK MZT Skopje players
KK Rabotnički players
Macedonian men's basketball players
People from Gostivar
Power forwards (basketball)